On 8 January 2023, following the defeat of then-president Jair Bolsonaro in the 2022 Brazilian general election, a mob of his supporters attacked Brazil's federal government buildings in the capital, Brasília. The mob invaded and vandalized the Supreme Federal Court, the National Congress building and the Planalto Presidential Palace in the Three Powers Plaza, seeking to violently overthrow the democratically elected president of Brazil Luiz Inácio Lula da Silva (Lula), who had been inaugurated on 1 January. Many rioters said their purpose was to spur military leaders to launch a coup d'état and disrupt the democratic transition of power. Neither Lula nor Bolsonaro were in Brasília at the time of the attack.

The attack occurred a week after Lula's inauguration and followed several weeks of unrest from Bolsonaro's supporters. It took more than five hours for the Brazilian security forces to clear all three buildings of the rioters, which happened at 21:00 BRT (UTC−03:00). The storming of the government buildings drew swift condemnation from governments around the world.

In response to the attack, at 18:00 BRT, Lula announced that he had signed a decree authorising a federal state of emergency in the Federal District through the end of January 2023. The Congress was not in session at the time of the attacks, but it swiftly ratified the declaration by 10 January.

Background 

During Bolsonaro's tenure as president of Brazil, his allies and supporters floated the idea of an assault like the United States Capitol attack of 6 January 2021 in the event Bolsonaro lost his re-election bid. Bolsonaro supporters alleged that the 2022 Brazilian general election suffered from widespread electoral fraud that caused Bolsonaro's loss. They claimed electronic voting machine malfunctions and deemed some voting patterns suspicious, and mistrusted election officials. The military helped oversee the election and found no signs of fraud. Supporters of Bolsonaro used social media to spread misinformation about supposed electoral fraud, further motivating the protesters.

Koury's video about the shutdowns was shared in several Bolsonarist groups on Telegram and, days later, members of these same groups started defending roadblocks after the elections. Calls for strikes were also made on YouTube.

Trucker protests lost strength on 3 November 2022, and Bolsonaro supporters began to gather in the vicinity of Brazilian Armed Forces facilities. Demonstrations took place at military installations in the cities of São Paulo, Rio de Janeiro, Brasília, Florianópolis, Recife, Salvador, and other cities and regions. Some Bolsonaro supporters called for a military coup.

The electoral victory of Luiz Inácio Lula da Silva (Lula) was officially ratified by the Superior Electoral Court on 12 December 2022. Militant far-right Bolsonaro supporters stormed the Federal Police headquarters in Brasília and torched vehicles on the street after one of the protesters was arrested for inciting violence to prevent Lula's swearing-in. The police used stun grenades and tear gas to disperse them. A bombing attempt near Brasília International Airport was prevented by the police on 23 December; the suspect was arrested a day later. According to his testimony, he was motivated by Bolsonaro casting doubts on the integrity of the election process in the past. Other attacks were carried out by Bolsonaro supporters during the beginning of Lula's government.

On 2 January 2023, former Bolsonaro minister Anderson Torres was appointed as chief security official of the Federal District. Torres left Brazil on the night of 6 January for Orlando, Florida, United States, arriving there on 7 January, just hours before the attacks and one week after Bolsonaro had arrived in Orlando.

Planning and financing 
Reports of a planned attack were already circulating in the first week of 2023, with audio leaked from several WhatsApp and Telegram groups. The material obtained exposed the intention to provoke violent actions by the crowd, and circumvent police action. Several groups and communities from throughout the country arranged for transport by bus to Brasília to participate in the demonstrations. Social media sites such as Twitter, Facebook and Instagram did not moderate misleading claims about the election, meaning that people who used these sites to find information about the election were presented with these misleading claims. The attack was also referred to before the fact as "Selma’s Party", a code phrase used on social media to discuss plans without arousing suspicion. Variants on the phrase were used to discuss planned riots in other cities.

Members of the federal cabinet were aware of the rioters' plans, but were assured by Governor of the Federal District Ibaneis Rocha that the situation was under control. The district government on 6 January planned to prevent them from reaching the National Congress, and also closed access to its esplanade. However, Rocha changed the agreed-upon plans shortly before the protest and opened the esplanade to protesters. As a result, the security contingent which was present when the invasion began was easily overwhelmed. The plan had called for the deployment of more than 1,300 officers from the Civil Police of the Federal District and about 200 officers of the National Public Security Force, but the actual number was only in the dozens, which Rocha blamed on the public security secretary of Brasília, Anderson Torres. O Estado de S. Paulo reported that the Planalto Military Command had rejected the need for reinforcements at the presidential palace.

Anonymous government officials told The Washington Post that the buses that transported Bolsonaro supporters to Brasília had been paid for by donors from ten states, including some involved in the agribusiness sector. Minister of Justice Flávio Dino stated that up to that point it had not been possible to "clearly distinguish" those responsible for financing the buses.  He added: "What you can definitely say is that there was funding." Dino later stated that the donors particularly belonged to the agribusiness sector and engaged in illegal activities.

Events 

Protesters had been gathering in front of Army facilities in several Brazilian cities ever since Bolsonaro lost the presidential election to Lula in October. In January, Lula's government attempted to remove these protesters. When this failed, it ordered reinforced security. That week the minister of justice also reiterated that the camps would be dismantled. On the morning of 7 January, more than 100 buses arrived in Brasília from all parts of Brazil, bringing in Bolsonaro supporters. They joined the 200 protesters camped in front of the Army Headquarters, raising the total number of people there to over 4,000. On the morning of January 8, Defence Minister José Múcio visited the camp, he later said that the situation was "calm, for now"

At around 13:00 BRT, the demonstrators marched from the Army Headquarters, during the march, some people were detained in front of the Ministry of Defence building and the National Stadium, with police reporting that some protesters were armed; An car passing through the march was damaged by demonstrators, and the driver was attacked with sticks; One witness reported that an protester screamed "we are going to break everything!", an protester detained by police later reported that they intended to invade the congress building. As the protesters marched, military police escorted them, with an officer reportedly saying that they would "guarantee the security of those marching".

Despite this, some members of the military police were caught being lenient with the attackers. At around 15:10 BRT, protesters began attacking the National Congress building, where they again clashed with police, by 15:30 BRT, police began firing tear gas against protesters as an effort to protect the buildings The mob then attempted to enter the Palácio do Planalto, the seat of executive power, and the Supreme Federal Court. The federal government estimated that around 5,000 people had taken part.

Senator Veneziano do Rêgo confirmed to CNN Brazil that protesters had managed to invade the Congress building. According to him, they reached the upper floor, where the domes of the Federal Senate and the Chamber of Deputies are located, and the Green Hall of the Chamber of Deputies. Protesters attempted to extend a green and yellow banner over the building. Some protestors among the mob were also seen with the flag of the Empire of Brazil. Many rioters were also seen praying and crying during the attack, while some were picking up stones from the ground using pickaxes to throw at the police.

The protesters later climbed the ramp of the Congress building and reached the Supreme Federal Court building and the Palácio do Planalto, where they, in an attempt to enter the buildings, committed acts of vandalism and looting, as well as violence against the police, a situation of chaos and widespread destruction was created, videos showed protesters chanting "Break everything!", "You have to break everything!". Between 15:50 and 16:00, after several confrontations, the protesters managed to enter both buildings, where more vandalism (including destruction of artworks) and fighting ensued. In the Supreme Federal Court building, police arrested 8 protesters that attempted to enter the offices inside the building, protesters extended a Brazilian flag in the windows of the building in an attempt to protect against rubber bullets and stun grenades used by police. By 16:25 BRT, soldiers from the National Public Security Force reached the ministries esplanade and rapidly began clearing out protesters from the region.

Soldiers from the Brazilian Army responded. Two helicopters tried to disperse the crowd. A National Force vehicle was reportedly set on fire and pushed into the reflecting pool of the monument during the confrontations. Several journalists were attacked during the protests. Folha de São Paulo photographer Pedro Ladeira was attacked and robbed by some of the rioters. A journalist for Metrópoles was also attacked during the storming. Journalists and photographers from BandNews, O Tempo, AFP and Reuters were also attacked. Some were pushed to the ground and had their equipment stolen or damaged. At least 10 journalists and photographers from different news outlets were attacked and/or robbed during the riot.

At 16:25 BRT, Augusto Aras, Prosecutor-General of Brazil, asked the Prosecutor-General of the Federal District to open a criminal investigation. At 17:08 BRT, the governor of the Federal District, Ibaneis Rocha, assured that he was "taking all measures to contain the anti-democratic riot in the Esplanada dos Ministérios"; in addition, he dismissed the secretary of security of the Federal District, Anderson Torres. At 17:50 BRT, Lula announced that he had signed a decree authorising a federal public security intervention in Brasília, to continue until 31 January. Lula also blamed Bolsonaro for the attack during a interview.

Lula invoked Article 34, Subheading III of the Federal Constitution, which empowers the government to put an end to a serious impairment of public order. It was the third application of Article 34 of the 1988 Federal Constitution, which has previously been applied in Rio de Janeiro and Roraima during the Temer Government. Ricardo Garcia Cappelli, executive secretary of the Ministry of Justice and Public Security, was appointed as intervenor. The intervention relieved the Federal District governor, Ibaneis Rocha, of the authority to oversee security in the district, and will last until 31 January.

By around 17:00 BRT, security forces had regained control of the Supreme Court building, though some rioters remained encamped in its parking garage. Police began arresting rioters en masse in the ministries esplanade by 18:20 BRT. The Brazilian Army arrived in military trucks in the late afternoon and ambushed the intruders in the presidential palace through the back door. The rioters had left the building by 18:30 BRT, with some being escorted out by the police.

At 18:30 BRT, The Attorney General of the Union reported that it had filed a request for Torres's arrest. By 19:00 BRT, over 150 people had been arrested by the security forces, at least 30 of them in flagrante delicto in the Federal Senate. Among those arrested before and during the attack, some were carrying knives, machetes, stilettos, scissors, pocket knives, slingshots with marbles and tin spheres, stakes, cloth soaked with vinegar (for use against tear gas and pepper spray), and even explosives (such as grenades), material for making molotov cocktails, blowtorches and fireworks, among others; some also used balaclavas, gas masks, gloves, ski masks, and protective equipment, possibly as an effort to hide their identities.

The minister of justice, Flávio Dino, later announced in a press conference that approximately 200 people were arrested in flagrante delicto, and that new arrests were still being made; according to Dino, several buses to Brasília, and their financiers, had been investigated and identified. Federal District governor, Ibaneis Rocha, in a publication on a social network, stated that more than 400 people had been arrested. Security forces managed to retake the National Congress by evening, after mounted police arrived using batons to disperse protesters. Justice Minister Flávio Dino announced by 21:00 BRT that all three buildings had been cleared.

At the time of the riots, neither Lula nor Bolsonaro were in Brasília: Lula was in Araraquara, city in the interior of São Paulo, with the mayor Edinho Silva and ministers Luiz Marinho, Jader Filho and Waldez Goés, surveying the city after heavy rains in the municipality; Bolsonaro was in Orlando, Florida, in the United States, where he had been since the last days of 2022, even before the end of his term.

Aftermath

Damage and theft 

A number of important spaces in the three stormed buildings were extensively vandalized and looted, including the Noble Hall and Plenary of the Federal Supreme Court, the Green, Blue and Black Halls and the lobby of the Congress, as well as the Noble Hall and the First Lady's office at the Planalto Palace. Many other spaces, such as corridors, windows, rooms and offices, were also vandalised, damaging a large amount of furniture, equipment and other objects. Several spaces were completely destroyed. According to an official, the invaders destroyed fire hydrants, in an attempt to prevent the fight against fires that existed at various points of the invasion.

"A Justiça", a statue by Alfredo Ceschiatti, was sprayed with graffiti, "Araguaia", a stained glass window by Marianne Peretti, was damaged, "A Bailarina", sculpture by Victor Brecheret, was taken by a protester, but later found damaged on the ground, and an clock made by made by Balthazar Martinot, which was given by the French court to John VI of Portugal, was thrown to the ground by a protester, who was later arrested by police.

A soccer ball signed by Neymar was stolen by a protester, but it was later recovered by the Federal Police. A golden shell with a pearl, which was a gift by Minister of Foreign Affairs and Deputy Prime Minister of Qatar, Mohammed bin Abdulrahman Al-Thani, was taken by rioters, while a decoration in the shape of an ostrich egg, a gift by Ahmed Ibrahim El-Tahir, the President of the Sudanese National Assembly, was destroyed; two vases, given by Lászlo Kövér, President of the National Assembly of the Republic of Hungary, and Wang Zhaoguo, Vice-Chairman of the Standing Committee of the National People's Congress of the People's Republic of China, to Marco Maia, President of the Chamber of Deputies, were also destroyed during the invasion. A bust of Ruy Barbosa, as well as a carpet that was owned by Princess Isabel (and several other carpets, which were innundated by anti-fire systems), were also damaged by protesters. Furniture brought from the Monroe Palace (such as desks and chairs) was damaged, as well as an inkwell (from the times of the Empire of Brazil), an Persian carpet, an crucifix, and the chair used by Rosa Weber, designed by Jorge Zalszupin,

Electronic devices – including laptops, phones, desktops, printers, photographic lens and televisions – were also damaged or stolen by protesters; others, such as a copy of the original 1988 constitution book and an Coat of arms of Brazil, were initially taken by the rioters, but were later found among the rubble in the building of the Supreme Federal Court. The offices of the Workers' Party and of the Brazilian Social Democracy Party in the Congress building were also invaded and vandalised by the mob. The office of Alexandre de Moraes was vandalized, its door was sprayed with graffiti, and his closet's door was taken by an protester; other offices inside the building were also vandalized, with some chairs and desks being taken by protesters to be used in barricades. Rioters urinated and defecated in the press areas of the Congress building. Protesters also stole weapons, munitions and documents from the Cabinet of Institutional Security in the Planalto. In an interview with CNN Brasil, Senator Randolfe Rodrigues said five abandoned grenades were found after the invasion, three of which were left at the Supreme Federal Court and two at the  Congress complex.

Power sabotage 
On 9 January 2023 (one day after the Brasilia attacks), three transmission towers in the states of Rondônia and Paraná (both of which are Bolsonaro's strongholds) were pulled down and cut off of Brazil's power grid. In the most serious incident, one tower connecting Brazil's mega hydropower plant Itaipu to the country's grid was damaged by a tractor. According to the Brazilian National Electricity watchdog (ANEEL), no storm or natural disaster happened in those areas to sustain a natural cause for the towers collapse, which raised suspicions among government officials that some acts of sabotage by Bolsonaro supporters were underway to knock out power. An additional tower in the interior of São Paulo state was damaged on 13 January. However, alternative towers were switched on and no effective power cut took place in all the incidents.

Legal action 

After the federal buildings were retaken, Justice of the Supreme Court Alexandre de Moraes suspended governor of the Federal District Ibaneis Rocha for 90 days, due to the shortcomings in security preparedness. He also ordered clearing of camps set up by protesters outside military bases within 24 hours, clearing of all roads and buildings occupied by them, and removal of all anti-democratic posts by Bolsonaro supporters from Facebook, Twitter and TikTok.

The police started clearing the protest camps near army bases throughout the country on 9 January. Soldiers backed by the police dismantled a camp outside the army headquarters in Brasília, which had been used as a base by those who had attacked the Three Powers Plaza. They arrested around 1,400 people before, during and after the attack; 684 of them were later released on humanitarian grounds. An earlier attempt by federal government officials to arrest suspects involved in the attack at the camp on the night of 8 January was blocked by the Brazilian Army commander Júlio Cesar de Arruda. Arrest warrants for around 50 people allegedly involved in the invasion were issued, according to Justice Minister Flávio Dino.

On 10 January, Moraes issued arrest warrants for the former public security secretary of Brasília Anderson Torres, and the Federal District Military Police chief, Fabio Augusto Vieira. The Justice Ministry stated that the police had found a draft presidential decree authorizing Bolsonaro to overturn the elections by implementing a "state of defense" on the Superior Electoral Court while searching the house of Torres. His lawyer claimed that the draft was a proposal by civilians and was never submitted to Bolsonaro, while Torres stated that it was taken out of context and was going to be eventually shredded. The National Congress meanwhile authorized Lula's decree for federal intervention in Brasília and Deputy Justice Minister Ricardo Cappelli's appointment to oversee it.

President Lula announced a security review of officials posted at the presidential palace on 12 January. He said that he believed that doors had been deliberately left unlocked in the attack, and that no hardcore Bolsonaro supporter would be allowed to work in the building. Moraes on 13 January agreed to include Bolsonaro as part of the investigation into the riots over him questioning the legitimacy of the elections on 10 January. Torres was arrested on the following day after returning to Brasília.

The office of the Prosecutor General of Brazil presented charges against the accused for the first time on 17 January, charging 39 people with armed criminal association, violent attempt to subvert the democratic state of law, staging a coup and damage to public property. In an interview on 18 January, Lula blamed the intelligence services of the armed forces and the Brazilian Intelligence Agency for failing to alert him to the possibility of an attack. He dismissed Arruda from the post of commander of the army on 21 January, replacing him with Tomás Miguel Ribeiro Paiva.

Fines and damages 
Since 9 January 2023 several lawsuits have been filed aiming to compensate and/or impose fines over the property damage caused by the attackers, and their financers. Over $14 million BRL (nearly $2 million USD) in public property were lost during the attacks according to the Attorney General of Brazil who has successfully asked to freeze 18.5 million BRL (approximately $3.5 million USD) from persons and companies who financed the perpetrators.

Reactions

See also 

Right-wing terrorism
2017 Venezuelan National Assembly attack
2017 storming of the Macedonian Parliament
2019 Indonesian election protests
2019 South Korean Capitol attack

2022 Iraq parliament attack
2022 German coup d'état plot
List of coups and coup attempts in Brazil
Proclamation of the Brazilian Republic
Brazilian Revolution of 1930
1937 Brazilian coup d'état
1945 Brazilian coup d'état
1964 Brazilian coup d'état

References

External links 
 

2023 in Brazilian politics
2023 protests
2023 riots
21st century in Brasília
Articles containing video clips
Attacks on buildings and structures in 2023
Attacks on buildings and structures in Brazil
Attacks on legislatures
Electoral violence
Far-right politics in Brazil
Jair Bolsonaro
January 2023 events in Brazil
Luiz Inácio Lula da Silva
Occupations (protest)
Political riots
Protests against results of elections
Right-wing terrorist incidents
Riots and civil disorder in Brazil